Dark Reflections is a novel by Samuel R. Delany, published in 2007 by Carroll & Graf, an imprint of Avalon Publishing Group. In 2008 it received a Stonewall Book Award and was nominated for a Lambda Literary Award for Gay Men's Fiction.

Plot

Dark Reflections tells the story of Arnold Hawley, a gay African-American poet who lives most of his life in New York City. The novel is divided into three sections, each illustrating a period in Arnold's life, arranged chronologically backwards, from age to youth. In the first part, "The Prize", Hawley is between 52 and 68; a book of his poetry wins a prize and is commercially successful, but neither of his next two books repeat this, and he falls further into poverty. In the second, "Vashti in the Dark" (named after a story by Stephen Crane), Hawley is in his middle 30s; the section tells the story of his brief marriage to a homeless woman. The third, "The Book of Pictures", is set in Hawley's college days, when he is attracted to another gay man, but does not act on his desires.

Themes
Dark Reflections centers on themes of loneliness, sexual repression, fear, and the difficult and often unrewarding life of the artist. As in many other Delany works, a writer is a character in the novel, in this case the protagonist.

References

External links
 Errata for Dark Reflections, approved by the author.

2007 American novels
Novels by Samuel Delany

Novels about writers
Novels with gay themes
Novels set in New York City
2000s LGBT novels
Carroll & Graf books
Works about sexual repression

2007 LGBT-related literary works